Bagaladi is a comune (municipality) in the Metropolitan City of Reggio Calabria in the Italian region Calabria, located about  southwest of Catanzaro and about  southeast of Reggio Calabria.  

Bagaladi borders the following municipalities: Cardeto, Montebello Ionico, Reggio Calabria, Roccaforte del Greco, San Lorenzo.

References

External links
 Official website

Cities and towns in Calabria